Boris Yevgenievich Bystrov (born February 12, 1945) is a Soviet and Russian actor and voice actor.

Biography
In 1966, he graduated from the Moscow Art Theatre. After graduating, he worked at the Lenkom Theatre.

Selected filmography

Actor
 1966: Aladdin's Magic Lamp as Aladdin
 1970: Adventures of the Yellow Suitcase as pilot Verevkin
 1984: TASS Is Authorized to Declare... as Agafonov

Dubbing roles
 Animated Content
 1989: The Simpsons (voice-over translation) Season 9–16, Season 19 (all males), season 20-29 (some males)
 2007: The Simpsons Movie (full dub), as Homer Simpson and Dr. Nick
 1991: Darkwing Duck, as Vladimir Goudenov Grizzlikof, Comet Guy and Taurus Bulba
 1999-2003-2013: Futurama (voice-over translation) (all males)
 Animaniacs, Wakko Warner
 Film
1980: Ilgais ceļš kāpās as Heinrich

References

External links

1945 births
Living people
Soviet male voice actors
Soviet male stage actors
20th-century Russian male actors
Russian male voice actors
Russian male stage actors
People's Artists of Russia
Honored Artists of the Russian Federation
21st-century Russian male actors
Moscow Art Theatre School alumni